The End of That is the third full-length album by Canadian indie rock band Plants and Animals, released on February 28, 2012 on Secret City Records.

The album was recorded at La Frette Studios near Paris, France, with engineer Lionel Darenne. Unlike the band's earlier albums, which were developed through improvisational jamming in the studio, the band developed the material for The End of That in advance, resulting in a far faster completion rate than any of the earlier albums.

The album's first single, "Lightshow", was released as a 7" single, with a previously unreleased cover of Wolf Parade's "I'll Believe in Anything" as its B-side, and subsequently topped CBC Radio 3's The R3-30 weekly singles chart on February 11. The title song, "The End of That", was used as the credits song of the 2013 film Drinking Buddies, starring Olivia Wilde and Jake Johnson.

The album debuted at number 46 in Canada.

Track listing
 "Before" – 3:56
 "The End of That" – 4:04
 "Song for Love" – 4:40
 "Lightshow" – 3:35
 "Crisis!" – 6:08
 "2010" – 6:33
 "HC" – 0:51
 "Why & Why" – 2:27
 "Control Me" – 4:15
 "No Idea" – 2:35
 "Runaways" – 5:11

iTunes-only bonus tracks
 "Shakey Shakey Shakey" – 7:35
 "Brokedown" – 5:44

Personnel
Credits adapted from Discogs
 Warren C. Spicer – vocals, acoustic guitar, electric guitar, bass, piano, organ, synthesizer, mixing
 Nicolas Basque – electric guitar, classical guitar, synthesizer, vocals
 Matthew Woodley – drums, percussion, vocals
 Olivier Bloch-Lainé – bass (track 2)
 Caroline Desilets - vocals (tracks 2,5), piano (track 5), inside photo
 Emilie Clepper - vocals (tracks 2,5)
 Hanako Hoshimi-Caines - vocals (tracks 2,5)
 Katie Moore - vocals (tracks 2,5)
 Plants And Animals – producers
 Ryan Morey – mastering
 Carl Rowatti - vinyl mastering
 Graham Lessard - mixing
 Lionel Darenne - recording
 Nicolas Quéré - recording assistant
 Trevor Browne – cover, layout

References

2012 albums
Plants and Animals albums
Secret City Records albums